Yiorgos Vardinogiannis is a Greek businessman and a shipping magnate, former owner and president of the Panathinaikos football club. He was born in Episkopi, Rethymno in 1936. He is the brother of oil and shipping tycoon Vardis Vardinogiannis.

Career

Seafaring career  

He completed his maritime studies at Southampton before embarking on a seafaring career. He managed to be promoted to the rank of captain and then along with his brothers found the family ship and oil business.

Rhodesian sanction busting
Yiorgos Vardinoyannis was captain of the oil tanker MV Arietta Venezelos which in February 1966 was located in the Persian Gulf. The Greek government, reacting to concerns that oil it was taking on board was destined for Rhodesia gave instructions to the owners, Venezelos SA to divert the ship to Rotterdam rather than South Africa and forbade the delivery of oil to Rhodesia. However, Vardinogiannis continued to sail for Beira in Mozambique, then a colony of Portugal. Here the pipeline would allow oil to be pumped to landlocked Rhodesia.

Football
He was president of Greek football club Panathinaikos FC for 21 years (1979–2000) and had the nickname Kapetanios (Captain).

References

Greek businesspeople
Living people
1936 births
Panathinaikos A.O.
Panathinaikos F.C.
Panathinaikos F.C. presidents
Greek football chairmen and investors
Greek businesspeople in shipping
Greek billionaires
People in the petroleum industry
People from Lappa, Rethymno